François-Augustin Bridoux (1813-1892) was a French engraver. He won the Prix de Rome in 1834.

References

1813 births
1892 deaths
People from Abbeville
19th-century French engravers
19th-century French male artists
Prix de Rome for engraving